Félix Juan Serrallés IV (born June 24, 1992) is a Puerto Rican racing driver. After gathering two second-place finishes in the Caribbean Karting Championship, Serrallés joined the Skip Barber National Championship and finished third. Afterwards, he was recruited by Fortec Motorsport and moved to Europe, where he debuted in the Formula Renault. By 2012, Serrallés had fully adapted to formula racing, remaining in the run for the British Formula 3 Championship until the final race of the season and eventually finishing third. After being sidelined by a back injury for most of 2013, he joined Team West-Tec for the 2014 season of the European Formula 3 Championship.

Early years
Félix Juan Serrallés IV was born on 24 June 1992 in Ponce, Puerto Rico. He is the grandson of Puerto Rican Don Q rum magnate Félix Juan Serrallés Jr., the president of Destilería Serrallés headquartered in the same town and grandson of the late Puerto Rican entrepreneur, industrialist and inventor Efraín D. Vassallo Ruíz of Industrias Vassallo fame.

Career

Karting
Serrallés began his racing career in karting at the age of ten and was runner-up in the Caribbean Championship in both 2004 and 2005.

Skip Barber National Championship
After winning a scholarship in 2009 Skip Barber Shootout, Serrallés became a Mazdaspeed Development Driver and had a season in Skip Barber National Championship, where he finished third with two wins.

Formula Renault
In 2010, Serrallés raced in Europe, taking part in the Formula Renault UK Winter Cup for Fortec Motorsport as a guest driver. He continued his collaboration with Fortec into 2011 and the Formula Renault Eurocup, scoring eight points-scoring finishes on his way to twelfth place in the series standings. He also appeared in Formula Renault UK in twelve of the season's twenty races as a guest driver and the Formula Renault UK Finals Series, where he claimed two podiums and finished eighth overall.

Toyota Racing Series
Serrallés contested the Toyota Racing Series in January and February 2012 with Giles Motorsport, finishing ninth in the championship with a win at the New Zealand Grand Prix meeting at Manfield.

Formula Three

On 4 January 2012, it was announced that Serrallés had rejoined Fortec Motorsports for a season in the British Formula 3 Championship. At the opening round of the season at Oulton Park, Serrallés qualified on the front row for the third race of the meeting, and after beating Carlin's Jack Harvey off the grid, Serrallés held his own in the lead and eventually claimed victory, becoming the first Puerto Rican to win in the series. He added a second victory a week later at Monza, winning the second race of the meeting in torrential rain.

Indy Lights
In 2015 Serallés drives for Belardi Auto Racing in the Indy Lights Series.

Racing record

Career summary

 As Serrallés was a guest driver, he was ineligible for points.

Complete FIA Formula 3 European Championship results
(key)

Indy Lights

Complete Blancpain GT Series Sprint Cup results

References

External links

 
 
 

1992 births
Living people
Sportspeople from Ponce, Puerto Rico
Puerto Rican racing drivers
British Formula Renault 2.0 drivers
Formula Renault Eurocup drivers
Toyota Racing Series drivers
British Formula Three Championship drivers
Formula 3 Euro Series drivers
FIA Formula 3 European Championship drivers
Indy Lights drivers
U.S. F2000 National Championship drivers
Carlin racing drivers
Blancpain Endurance Series drivers
Belardi Auto Racing drivers
Mücke Motorsport drivers
Team West-Tec drivers
Jo Zeller Racing drivers
Fortec Motorsport drivers
Mercedes-AMG Motorsport drivers